Elias Bertram Mott (March 11, 1879 – September 23, 1961) was an American  Republican Party politician who served as chairman of the New Jersey Republican State Committee and as county clerk of Morris County, New Jersey for more than 50 years.

Biography
Mott was born in 1879 in Rockaway Township, New Jersey to Elias Briant and Lauretta W. Mott. He attended public schools in Rockaway Township, before going on to Wyoming Seminary in Kingston, Pennsylvania, where he graduated in 1896. He studied law privately and was admitted to the New Jersey Bar in 1901.

In 1897 Mott first worked as an aide to his father, Elias B. Mott, who was Morris County Clerk at the time. He was appointed deputy county clerk the following year, and would be elected as county clerk in 1908, a position he would hold until his death in 1961.

In 1922 he was elected a member of the New Jersey Republican State Committee. He became chairman of the State Committee in 1927, succeeding former Governor of New Jersey Edward C. Stokes, who resigned to run for United States Senate.  He served in the position for seven years.

Mott died in 1961 at Morristown Memorial Hospital at the age of 82.

References

External links
Biographical information for E. Bertram Mott from The Political Graveyard

1879 births
1961 deaths
Chairmen of the New Jersey Republican State Committee
New Jersey lawyers
People from Rockaway Township, New Jersey
New Jersey Republicans